is a Japanese judoka. 

He was born in Tenmei(ja), Kumamoto Prefecture, and began judo at the age of a fifth grader. 

After graduating from Nippon Sport Science University, he worked with a teacher in Yamagata and Yamanashi.
He won a gold medal at the -65 kg category of the World Championships in 1987.
 
As of 2009, Yamamoto coaches judo at his alma mater, Nippon Sport Science University, where he previously studied as an undergraduate. Among his students is former Pacific Rim champion Arata Kojima.

References

External links
 

Japanese male judoka
Sportspeople from Kumamoto Prefecture
Olympic bronze medalists for Japan
Olympic judoka of Japan
Judoka at the 1988 Summer Olympics
Nippon Sport Science University alumni
1960 births
Living people
Olympic medalists in judo
Asian Games medalists in judo
Judoka at the 1986 Asian Games
Medalists at the 1988 Summer Olympics
Asian Games silver medalists for Japan
Medalists at the 1986 Asian Games
Goodwill Games medalists in judo
Competitors at the 1990 Goodwill Games